The Three Gorges Museum is a museum in the Yuzhong District of Chongqing, about the Three Gorges and Chongqing. It is one of the largest museums in the country.

The museum opened in 2005, replacing the former Chongqing Museum. It is located near the Chongqing People's Hall. It aims to undertake education, preservation, and scientific research with respect to cultural heritage and the natural environment in Chongqing and the Three Gorges region of the Yangtze River.

The exterior of the museum has sloping walls and is topped by a large glass dome. There are bronze sculptures, large reliefs, and 1-km (1,094 yards) long "Ecological Corridor".

The museum covers an area of 42,497 m2 (c. 50,828 square yards). The exhibition hall covers 23,225 m2 (c. 27,778 square yards). There are four main displays:

 Glorious Three Gorges
 Ancient Ba-Yu – early history of Chongqing
 Chongqing: the City Road – 20th century history
 The Anti-Japanese War (1937–1945)

Further displays include:

 Painting and calligraphy
 Porcelain
 Coins
 Sculpture from the Han Dynasty (206 BCE –220 CE)
 Folk customs of southwest China
 Cultural objects given by Li Chuli

Another major exhibit is a 180° panorama of wartime Chongqing when it was the provisional capital of Free China and was subjected to Japanese bombardment. There is also a 360° cinema showing the natural and social scenery of the Three Gorges before the dam was constructed. A 1st-floor exhibition on the Three Gorges includes a model of the Three Gorges Dam.

See also
 Baiheliang Underwater Museum
 Chongqing Zoo

References

External links

 Museum website 

Yuzhong District
2005 establishments in China
Museums established in 2005
Museums in Chongqing
National first-grade museums of China
Art museums and galleries in China
Natural history museums in China
Yangtze River
Domes